From List of National Natural Landmarks, these are the National Natural Landmarks in Utah.  There are 4 in total.

Utah
National Natural Landmarks